Salim Sdiri (born 26 October 1978) is a French long jumper of Tunisian descent. His personal best is 8.42 metres, achieved in June 2009 at Pierre-Bénite, which is the current French national record. He is also the French national record holder for indoor long jump with an 8.27 m jump in 2006. He has jumped eight meters or more every season since 2002 and has a bronze medallion from the 2007 European Indoor Athletics Championships.

Career

Rome javelin accident
On Friday 13 July 2007, during the IAAF Golden League at Rome's Olimpico Stadium, Sdiri was hit in the scapula by a stray javelin thrown by the Finnish athlete Tero Pitkämäki. The javelin thrower slipped and threw the javelin towards the area where the jumpers were warming up.

Sdiri was rushed to a local hospital in Rome with non life-threatening injuries. The doctors believed, at the time, that the javelin had missed any vital organs by 4 centimetres. However, two days later, Sdiri was rushed back to the ER as the prognosis was incorrect. The javelin had actually torn a hole in his liver and torn and punctured the right kidney slightly. Sdiri responded to the many interviewers by saying:
The javelin touched the right kidney and there is a slight tear at the top of the kidney....the liver was also touched leaving a hole in it. The javelin penetrated over ten centimetres and not four as we initially thought.

Return to competition
After months of rehabilitation and questioning, he decided to prepare himself to return to competition for the Beijing Olympics in early 2008. However, he did not qualify.

On 12 June 2009, Sdiri beat the former French record holder for long jump, Kader Klouchi (8.30 m in 1998) with an 8.43 m jump. Sdiri was selected to compete in the World Championships in Berlin in August 2009. He finished 6th, with an 8.07 m jump.

On 27 February 2012, in Paris-Bercy, Sdiri became the French champion in the indoor long jump by setting the best performance of the year worldwide with a jump of 8.24 m, just missing his French record by 3 centimetres. On 12 March 2012, he qualified for the finals in the long jump at the World Indoor Championships with a 7.94 m jump. He came second with an 8.01 m jump versus the 8.17 m jump of Fabrice Lapierre.

Achievements

Mediterranean Games
 Sdiri holds the record for the games with an 8.29 m jump in 2009.
He is also the recipient of the trophy awarded to athletes that are selected for competition over 20 times internationally by the International Sports Federation in 2010.

References

External links
 

1978 births
Living people
French male long jumpers
French sportspeople of Tunisian descent
Athletes (track and field) at the 2004 Summer Olympics
Athletes (track and field) at the 2008 Summer Olympics
Athletes (track and field) at the 2012 Summer Olympics
Olympic athletes of France
Mediterranean Games gold medalists for France
Athletes (track and field) at the 2005 Mediterranean Games
Athletes (track and field) at the 2009 Mediterranean Games
Mediterranean Games medalists in athletics